This is an alphabetical list of notable Marxian economists, that is, experts in the social science of economics that follow and develop Marxian economic theory. The list also includes some economic sociologists who have written from a Marxian perspective.

List of Marxian economists

See also
List of contributors to Marxist theory
Socialist economics
Communism
Socialism

 
Lists of scholars and academics
Lists of people by ideology
Marxian economists